Tiquadra pontifica is a moth of the family Tineidae. It is known from French Guiana

This species has a wingspan of about 22 mm. The forewings are whitish grey, the markings dark grey mixed with blackish. There is a mark on the base of the costa and a transverse fascia of irregular strigulation or marbling at one-third, where a bar runs below the middle to the base, and another bar in the middle to a large irregular patch of similar marbling occupying nearly the apical third of the wing and partially suffused brownish. The hindwings are dark grey.

References

Hapsiferinae
Moths described in 1919
Moths of South America